Vitas Gerulaitis was the defending champion, but lost in the semifinals this year.

Peter McNamara won the title, defeating Ivan Lendl 6–4, 4–6, 7–6 in the final.

Seeds

  Ivan Lendl (final)
  Jimmy Connors (second round)
  Vitas Gerulaitis (semifinals)
  Mats Wilander (semifinals)
  Peter McNamara (champion)
  Yannick Noah (quarterfinals)
  Steve Denton (quarterfinals)
  Johan Kriek (quarterfinals)

Draw

Finals

Top half

Bottom half

References

 Main Draw

1983 Grand Prix (tennis)
Donnay Indoor Championships